The 6th Foreign Infantry Regiment was an infantry regiment of the Foreign Legion in the   French Army from 1939 to 1941 and again from 1949 to 1955.

History, creations and different nominations

When first established the 6th Foreign Infantry Regiment consisted of 3,287 men. It was part of the 192nd Infantry Division. The regiment's organization featured:

HQ Staff, located at Homs
1st Battalion, formerly 4th Battalion of the 1st Foreign Infantry Regiment, garrisoned at Al-Suwayda.
2nd Battalion, formerly 1st Battalion of the 1st Foreign Infantry Regiment, garrisoned at Baalbek.
3rd Battalion, formerly 2nd Battalion of the 2nd Foreign Infantry Regiment, garrisoned at Damascus.
4th Battalion, formerly 6th Battalion of the 1st Foreign Infantry Regiment, garrisoned at Homs and Palmyra.

This regiment was designated as the "Legion Regiment of the French Levant".

On 1 January 1940 the regiment was formulated in two parts:
 A mountain regiment, commanded by Lieutenant-colonel Barre, which became on 19 March the same year the 6th Foreign Infantry Regiment, 6e R.E.I, Integrated at the 192nd Infantry Division, 192e D.I; the regiment constituted:
 1 Headquarter Staff
 1 Command Company
 1 Regimental Company (created March 1940 and designated (C.R.E))
 1 Exterior Company (designated "CHR",(C.H.R))
 1st Battalion
 2nd Battalion
 One motorized regiment typed outre-mer, which would become on 19 March the Foreign Legion Groupment of the Levant (G.L.E.L); the regiment constituted:
 1 Headquarter Staff
 1 Command Section
 3rd Battalion
 4th Battalion
 Legion Special Section

On 28 April 1940 the 1st Marching Battalion of Foreign Volunteers (1er BMVE), created in March 1940, was assigned to the 6th Foreign Infantry Regiment, 6e R.E.I and became the 11th Battalion of Foreign Volunteers (11e B.V.E) until dissolution on 16 October 1940.

On 1 January 1941 the Foreign Legion Groupment of the Levant (G.L.E.L) and under the authority of the 6th Foreign Infantry Regiment created a Legion Artillery Group of the Levant (G.A.L.L) compromising of 3 artillery batteries and the reorganization of the 6th Foreign Infantry Regiment: the "C.H.R" and the "C.R.E" were dissolved and the command company became the regimental company.

The regiment left Lebanon on 16 August 1941 and rejoined the Camp Idron (Pau) on 25 August before rejoining Sidi-bel-Abbès on 3 December 1941.

During the regiment's dissolve on 31 December 1941, the legionnaires of the 6th Foreign Infantry Regiment were assigned to the later reconstituted 1st Foreign Marching Infantry Regiment (1er R.E.I.M) and the Marching Regiment of the Foreign Legion (R.M.L.E).

The 6th Foreign Infantry Regiment, 6e R.E.I was recreated on 1 April 1949 in Tunisia. Accordingly, selection and dispatching was regularly done in order to reinforce Legion units engaged in combats in Indochina. In the meantime and while holding tenure in Tunisia, the regiment was assigned to tasks revolving around missions of maintaining of order. Subsequently, the regiment was dissolved for a second time on 30 June 1955.

History of the garrisons, campaigns and battles

The 6th Foreign Infantry Regiment, 6e R.E.I was founded on 15 October 1939 in Syria from elements of the disbanded 1st Foreign Infantry Regiment, 1er R.E.I and the 2nd Foreign Infantry Regiment. The Regiment was established in part to handle the large number of foreign volunteers for French military service at the beginning of World War II, which numbered around 64,000 at the regiment's founding. The 6th Foreign Infantry Regiment remained loyal to Vichy France at the beginning of World War II while opposing fraternally allied and foreign forces from 8 June to 24 July 1941, mainly within the cadre of the liberation of Lebanon. Following, the 6th Foreign Infantry Regiment was disbanded on 31 December 1941.

On another hand, the regiment was founded once more in Tunisia on 1 April 1949. The regiment went on to fight in the First Indochina War. Following service in Indochina, the regiment operated in Tunisia as part of French operations to maintain order. The Regiment was disbanded on 30 June 1955.

Tradition

Insignia 

The insignia of the 6th Foreign Infantry Regiment is represented by the form of a hexagon, three Roman columns of the temple of Jupiter at Baalbek to the left of the insign and the symbols of the Foreign Legion: red and green colors with the grenade with 7 flames in the center.

Regimental Colors

Regimental Song

Decorations

Honors

Battle Honors 
 Camarón 1863
 Musseifer 1925
 Syria 1925-1926

Regimental Commander 

6th Foreign Infantry Regiment, Formation I

Colonel Imhaus (1/10/1939 - 20/12/1939)
Lieutenant-colonel Barre (20/12/1939 - 10/1941 )
Lieutenant-colonel Delore (10/1941 - 12/1941)

6th Foreign Engineer Regiment, Formation II
01 04/1949 au 01 07/1955

Lieutenant-colonel René Babonneau
Lieutenant-colonel Rossi
Chef de bataillon Georgeon

Notable Officers 
Captain Pierre Segrétain, later regimental commander in the rank of chef de bataillon (commandant) of the 1st Foreign Parachute Battalion, killed in action in Indochina in October 1950 during the evacuation of Cao-Bang by the RC4.
Lieutenant Pierre Jeanpierre, survivor of the battle of RC4, later regimental commander of Lieutenant Colonel of the 1st Foreign Parachute Regiment, killed in action in Algeria in May 1958.
Sous-lieutenant then Lieutenant Pepin Lehalleur, 1st battalion of the 6th Foreign Infantry Regiment, who would become général.
Lieutenant Houzel.
Captain Serge Andolenko, headed the CR of the regiment in 1941, became général, after being regimental commander of the 5th Foreign Infantry Regiment in Algeria (1956-1958).

See also

Major (France)
French Foreign Legion Music Band (MLE)
Raoul Magrin-Vernerey, the first regimental commander of the 13th Demi-Brigade of the Foreign Legion
1st Free French Division

Notes

References
Porch, Douglas. The French Foreign Legion. New York: Harper Collins, 1991.

External links 
 6e REI - History & images of the 6e REI

Defunct French Foreign Legion units
Infantry regiments of France
Military units and formations established in 1939
Military units and formations disestablished in 1940
Military units and formations established in 1949
Military units and formations disestablished in 1955